The Happy Valley is a British television drama, first shown on BBC1 on 6 September 1987 in the Sunday Premiere strand. It was written by David Reid, directed by Ross Devenish, and produced by Cedric Messina. It stars Holly Aird as Juanita Carberry, Michael Byrne as her violent father, and Denholm Elliott as Jock Delves Broughton.

Plot
It is set in the British colony of Kenya in the 1940s, and tells the true story of the murder of Josslyn Victor Hay, the 22nd Earl of Erroll, as seen through the eyes of 15-year-old Juanita Carberry, the daughter of John Carberry, a friend of Broughton's.

Cast
 Denholm Elliott as Sir Henry 'Jock' Delves Broughton
 Holly Aird as Juanita Carberry
 Kathryn Pogson as June Carberry
 Michael Byrne as John Carberry
 Cathryn Harrison as Helen Tapsell
 Amanda Hillwood as Lady Diana Delves Broughton
 Peter Sands as Lord Erroll
 Richard Heffer as Asst. Supt. Poppy
 Mawa Makondo as Warganjo
 Kavundla as Gatimu
 Roshan Seth as Defence Solicitor
 Frank Lazarus as Doctor
 John Cartwright as Constable
 Abdulla Sunado as Witchdoctor
 Oliver Rowe as Ian Eatwell

Storyline remake
Lord Erroll's murder was also dramatised in the feature film White Mischief, which was released seven months after the first transmission of The Happy Valley.

See also
 Happy Valley set

References

External links

1987 television films
1987 drama films
BBC television dramas
British television films
British films based on actual events
Films set in Kenya
Films set in the British Empire